FFM may refer to:
 Fairchild Fashion Media, an American publisher
 Fat free mass, a measure of body composition
 Federally Facilitated Marketplace, health insurance exchange established by the US government
 Felivaru Fisheries, a state-owned fishery company in the Maldives
 FFM, IATA code for Fergus Falls Municipal Airport, in Minnesota, United States
 FFM, ICAO code for Firefly (airline), a Malaysian airline
 Five factor model, alternate term for Big Five personality traits
 "Focus follows mouse", a method of assigning focus (computing) in a GUI
 Football Federation of Macedonia, a Macedonian sports association
 Frankfurt am Main, city in Germany
 Free fall machine, a device for simulating a free-fall environment for biological samples
 Freedom Foundation of Minnesota, an American think tank
 Full face mask, alternate term for Full face diving mask
 ffm, ISO 639-3 code for the Maasina Fulfulde language, spoken in western Africa
  (Malaysia Film Festival)
  (Montreal World Film Festival)
 Fox Family Movies, an Asian television channel